Fremont Wash sometimes called Fremont Canyon in its upper reach, is a stream and a valley in the north end of Parowan Valley, in Iron County, Utah.

History
Fremont Wash was originally known as North Canyon Creek for the North Canyon from which it issued into the Parowan Valley at Muley Point.  North Canyon consisted of what is now Fremont Canyon and the valley of Fremont Wash between the Black Mountains and Hurricane Cliffs to Muley Point.

On the Mormon Road, the camp on North Canyon Creek, given the mileage recorded by Addison Pratt, was 27.5 miles south of the ford on the Beaver River. Captain Marcy's Prairie Traveler said it was in "... Little Salt Lake Valley, Good grass; no wood."  That would put it near Wheatgrass, Utah just above the Little Salt Lake.

References

Valleys of Iron County, Utah
Valleys of Utah
Rivers of Utah
Rivers of Iron County, Utah